Esteghlal Football Club (Bâšgâh-è Futbâl-è Esteqlâl), commonly known as Esteghlal (meaning 'The Independence'), is an Iranian football club based in capital Tehran that competes in the Persian Gulf Pro League. The club is part of the multisport club Esteghlal of Iran Athletic and Cultural Company. They were the first team to reach 1,000 points in Persian Gulf Pro League.

Since the 1973–74 season, Esteghlal has played its home games at the Azadi, which has a seating capacity of 78,116, though it can hold more people during important matches. Esteghlal set an attendance record for an Asian Club Championship match in 1999 when 125,000 supporters watched their final against Júbilo Iwata in Tehran. The club is owned and supported by the Ministry of Sport and Youth.

Esteghlal is one of the oldest football clubs in Tehran and Iran, and carries a deep history in Iranian football. It is one of the most supported and successful clubs in Iranian football, having won two AFC Champions League trophies, 9+1 national titles and a record seven national cups. Esteghlal is also leading the all-time table of the Persian Gulf Pro League. The club's historical crest was holding a crown, giving the club its nickname Crown of Asia. Esteghlal holds a longstanding enmity with local rivals Persepolis known as the Sorkhabi (red-blue) derby or the Tehran derby.

History

1945–69: Early years, The Crown 

On 20 September 1945, some young athletes and students including a 23-year-old military officer Parviz Khosravani (first manager of the club), Asghar Navaab (Bicycle Mechanic), Enayat Jananpour (National Sports Organisation staff member), Mirzaee (carpenter) and Khashaaei (bank guard) established a sports club on Ferdowsi Street, Tehran. Since the founders of the club were mostly interested in cycling, the club's original name was Docharkheh Savaran (meaning 'The Cyclists'), in 1945. Ali Danaeifard coach and player of tour joined to them and became the first coach and Captain of Esteghlal. Esteghlal football club played its first official match in 1946.

In the first year, the 1946 season, they stood in second place of Tehran Football League and Tehran Hazfi Cup. They played against strong teams like Daraei, Sarbaaz and Shahin.

The 1947 season ended with the first ever Esteghlal's cup, after victories against Daraei, Shahin and Oghaab to reach the Tehran Hazfi Cup.

Docharkhe Savaran founders and players consisted of Ali Danaeifard, Parviz Khosravani, Amou Oghli, Graeeli and Seyyed Ali Agha agreed with the rename of the club to Taj (meaning 'The Crown'), in 1949.

From the beginning Taj or Docharkeh Savaran competed in the Tehran Local League, which at the time was the highest ranked league in Iran. On 6 March 1950, Taj played its first official game in front of over 20,000 spectators in Amjadieh Stadium against Shahin; Taj managed a close 1–0 win.

Taj won seven first titles in the 1950s and 1960s; 1949–1950, 1951–1952, 1957–1958 and the three consecutive championships in 1959–1960, 1960–1961 and 1961–1962 (in the following years Taj added its first titles from the Tehran Provincial League and the Tehran Hazfi Cup) and again in 1963–1964 season (Persepolis established in this year at Tehran's 3rd Division).

Taj also won four Tehran Hazfi Cup in 1947, 1951, 1958 and 1959. The most successful club in Iran between that years, so far than other great teams like Daraei with three first titles and Shahin with two first titles and four-second place. The first national cup was obtained in 1957 National Football League after victory against Tabriz team by three goals.Taj represented tehrans's football in those games which played in Bagh-e-Homayun ground.

Ali Danaeifard managed Esteghlal for about twenty years, first as midfielder and coach and later in 1950 until 1967 as Coach of Taj. His son Iraj Danaeifard became the star of Taj and National team in the 70s and his daughter is a football coach. Fans call him Father of Esteghlal. Iraj scored the First ever Iranian goal during a World Cup Finals in 1978, with the equaliser against Scotland.

Some of the best players of those years as follows: Boyuk Jeddikar, Aref Gholizadeh, Parviz Koozehkanani, Mahmoud Bayati, Mohammad Ranjbar, Mohammad Amir Khatami, Nader Afshar Alavinejad, George Markarian, Kambozia Jamali, Karam Nayyerloo, Hassan Habibi, Heshmat Mohajerani, Fariborz Esmaeili, Parviz Aboutaleb, Mohammad Reza Adelkhani and Ali Jabbari.

Tehran old derby was a sensitive match which played between TAJ and Shahin in mid century, until 1967. After desolation of Shahin. Other teams added Shahin's players to their teams including newborn team Persepolis.
Shahin returned at 1974 as Shahbaz and in the 1980s as Shahin and was not related to Persepolis.
Boyuk Jeddikar is best scorer of that rival matches for Taj.

1970–78: Champion of Asia and Iran 
The 1970 Asian Club Championship was the 3rd edition of the annual Asian club football competition hosted by Asian Football Confederation. Seven clubs from seven countries competed in the tournament. The tournament was held in Tehran, Iran in April. The clubs were split in two groups and the group winners and runners-up advanced to semi-finals.
Taj defeated Hapoel Tel Aviv of Israel 2–1 in the final to win its first ever Asian Club Championship and started new era in Iranian football with announced of professionalisation of football in Iran.

This year had another honour for TAJ, the first Iranian national league title: 1970–71 Local League under management of legendary Rajkov. TAJ defeated PAS 2–1 in final match. Captain Ali Jabbari introduced as best player of the league. TAJ have reached to third place of 1971 Asian Club Championship, a year after the first Asian Cup of club. They were defeated ROK Army of Korea 3–2 in Third place match.

Esteghlal stood at second place in the 1973–74 league, with only two points less than Persepolis. Gholam Hossein Mazloumi was the top scorer of the league, with 15 goals. TAJ reached the 1974–75 Takht Jamshid Cup the next year, the second official Iranian Football League for Club. Mazloumi was still the best scorer. After the championship, Taj stars who had some problems with the manager left the club and went to Shahbaz FC (new name of Shahin FC); Mazloumi, Mohammad Reza Adelkhani and Naser Hejazi. Some old players like Captain Ali Jabbari, Mansour Pourheidari, Akbar Kargarjam, Abbas Mojdehi, Ezzat Jaanmaleki (Barbed Wire), Karo Haghverdian preferred to leave football. Social tensions came to the club, a rebellion against the system which named revolution in next years.

1979–2001: Revolution and post-revolution 
After the 1979 Islamic Revolution in Iran, the club was taken over by the newly established Islamic government and put under the control of the Physical Education Organization of the Islamic republic of Iran, a governmental organisation, and changed its name to Esteghlal, 'Independence' in Persian; Taj means 'Crown' in Persian. All players not swearing allegiance to the new Islamic government were arrested, brutally beaten and executed by Iran’s Revolutionary Guard Corps. After the revolution, any sign of the previous monarchist regime was not tolerated.

During the 1980s, Esteghlal won the Tehran Football League twice. The 1989–90 season was a memorable one for Esteghlal. The club finished 1st in Group B of the Qods League and advanced to the semi-finals. Esteghlal defeated Malavan 4–0 on aggregate to advance to the final against the hated rival: Persepolis. Esteghlal defeated Persepolis 2–1 with a 74th-minute goal by Samad Marfavi to win the Qods League; this proved to be one of the most memorable derbies for Esteghlal. In the following season, Esteghlal made it to the final of the Hazfi Cup only to lose to Malavan on penalties.

1990–91 proved to be one of Esteghlal's most memorable years as they won the Asian Club Championship for the 2nd time defeating Chinese club Liaoning 2–1. Mansour Pourheidari added another Asian Cup for Esteghlal as head coach, he played as defender in 1970 championships. In next year Esteghlal reached to 1991 Asian Club Championship final match again and they're lose the match in penalties to Al-Hilal FC. Esteghlal once again reached the final of the Asian Club Championship in 1999, this time losing to Japanese club Júbilo Iwata 1–2 in Tehran. It was an emotional match under coaching of Naser Hejazi.

2001–present: Iran Pro League Era 
2001 marked the first year of the newly founded Iran Pro League. Going into the final day, Esteghlal was on top of the league's table; however, with an Esteghlal loss and a Persepolis win, Persepolis was crowned as the league's inaugural champion. However, the 2001–02 Hazfi Cup provided some consolation for Esteghlal as they beat Fajr Sepasi 4–3 on aggregate to win the cup. The 2002–03 season was one of the worst years in club history, as they finished 9th under the management of Roland Koch and were eliminated in the group stage of the AFC Champions League.

In July 2003, Amir Ghalenoi was appointed manager of Esteghlal. In his first year, Esteghlal finished runner-up in the league, finishing two points behind the champion Pas Tehran. Ghalenoi also made it to the final of the Hazfi Cup losing 2–5 on aggregate to Sepahan. His second season proved to be less successful as Esteghlal finished 3rd and failed to qualify to the AFC Champions League. However, the 2005–06 season was a completely different year; Esteghlal were crowned champions of the Iran Pro League for the first time in the Pro League era. At the end of the season, Ghalenoi left Esteghlal for the national team job.

In 2006 after the departure of Amir Ghalenoi, his assistant and youth team coach Samad Marfavi took over the head-coaching job. Esteghlal had a disappointing season, finishing fourth, thus failing to secure a spot in the AFC Champions League, as well as only reaching the Round of 16 in the Hazfi Cup with a shock defeat by Fajr Sepasi. After Marfavi's departure in August 2007, another Esteghlali great, former goalkeeper Nasser Hejazi took over; but after only 14 games and 4 defeats, Hejazi was fired as manager in November 2007. Firouz Karimi was hired as the temporary head coach for the remainder of the season; he did not fare much better than Hejazi and the team finished 13th in the league, its lowest finish ever. Firouz Karimi was fired in May 2008 and Amir Ghalenoi was hired again in July 2008.
He quickly regrouped the team and the Hazfi Cup proved to be a valuable consolation, as Esteghlal became champions after defeating Pegah Gilan 3–1 on aggregate, thus securing a Champions League spot after a two-year absence. During Ghalenoi's first full and only season in his second stint with Esteghlal, he led the team to an Iran Pro League championship, finishing ahead of Zob Ahan on goal difference. However, after a group stage exit in the AFC Champions League, Ghalenoi resigned.

Samad Marfavi took the reins of Esteghlal for a second time; Marfavi led the team to a 3rd place league finish in the 2009–10 season and also led the team to the Round of 16 of the AFC Champions League, losing to Al Shabab of Saudi Arabia 2–3 on aggregate. In the spring of 2010, Marfavi extended his contract for another year, but strangely a few days later he resigned. This time Esteghlal turned to Parviz Mazloumi, a former Esteghlal player in the 1980s. During his 2-year tenure with Esteghlal, he led the team to 2nd and 3rd place league finishes, as well as a Hazfi Cup trophy in 2012. After a 0–2 loss to fellow countrymen Sepahan in the Round 16 of the AFC Champions League, Mazloumi was sacked by the club and Amir Ghalenoi took the reins of Esteghlal for a third time.

The new era started with an exciting year for Esteghlal as both former Aston Villa man Jlloyd Samuel and Iran national football team captain Javad Nekounam joined the team. With these players, Ghalenoi had no trouble leading Esteghlal to a comfortable league victory in his first season back. The team also made it to the semi-finals of the Hazfi Cup which they eventually lost to Sepahan. The year was also marked by advancing to the AFC Champions League semi-finals where they met Korean side FC Seoul. After a 0–2 away loss in the first leg, Esteghlal faced an uphill task; they returned to Azadi Stadium with much belief but eventually lost to FC Seoul 2–4 on aggregate.

The next season however was a disappointing one for Ghalenoi and his team. With a chance to win the league on the final match day, Esteghlal lost 1–3 to Tractor Sazi and dropped to 5th place, and out of a champions league slot. Esteghlal also faced a shock defeat at the hands of Mes Kerman in the Hazfi Cup semi-finals. To top off Esteghlal's horrendous year, the team failed to reach the AFC Champions League knock-out stage, finishing 3rd in its group. Amir Ghalenoi earned the title of "General" from the club's fans for his performance.

After Esteghlal's defeat to Zob Ahan in the Hazfi Cup final on 29 May 2016, Parviz Mazloomi was fired and replaced by former player and Naft Tehran's head coach Alireza Mansourian on 1 June 2016. Esteghlal started the season poorly and were knocked out of the Hazfi Cup in the Quarter-finals by Naft Tehran. The club was also issued a transfer ban for the 2017 winter period for outstanding debts to Adil Chihi. On 7 February 2017, Esteghlal defeated Qatari club Al Sadd on penalties to advance to the 2017 AFC Champions League group stage. Esteghlal was defeated by Al Ain 6–1 on quarter final of 2017 AFC Champions League and was eliminated. Mansourian was the head coach of Esteghlal until 7th week of 2017–18 season of Persian Gulf Pro League. Mansourian resigned after accumulating only 5 points in 7 matches and standing on 16th position. German coach Winfried Schäfer was appointed as new manager of Esteghlal Tehran on 1 October 2017, replacing Alireza Mansourian. He was fired in the spring of 2019 and Farhad Majidi replaced him, but was fired at the end of the season.

In June 2019, Italian coach Andrea Stramaccioni was appointed as Esteghlal's coach, but he later left the club in December 2019 due to financial insolvency.

Crest and symbols and estate
Unveiled in 1946, Docharkhehsavaran's first crest featured a blue cyclist cycling. In 1950 following change of club's name the crest changed to two interlocking rings on both sides of Pahlavi crown.

Before the revolution, the Taj sports complex had 5 sports clubs in Tehran and 66 clubs in the cities. 

Taj also had clubs in Turkey (under the name of Tajspor club) [and Qatar. 

Taj clubs in Tehran include Taj Central Palace on Baharestan Street, Pele Sports Club on Nizam Abad Street, Taj Women's Club on Los Angeles Street (now Hijab), Taj Tennis Club on Pahlavi Street (now Veli Asr) and Reza Pahlavi club was in Naziabad. Taj also had two sports stores in Tehran on Shahreza and Baharestan streets. 

With the Iranian revolution and on 28th of February , the Taj Central Palace and other places belonging to the Taj Club were taken over by the Revolutionary Committees.

The sports facilities were given to the Physical Training Organization and the administrative facilities or other services such as the sports store of the club were handed over to organizations such as the Islamic Propaganda Organization.Esteghlal Club's efforts to reclaim these places have not been successful so far.

According to Pele and statistics, this club was the second club in the world in terms of capital. After the Islamic Revolution, all the property of the club was taken by the Ministry of Sports of Iran. Now this club is the second team in Tehran province in terms of assets and the most popular football team in Asia and Iran.

Colours
Esteghlal wore blue shirts from the beginning with white or blue shorts and socks. The second colour of the club is white.

Historical kits

Rivalries

Tehran derby

The club's biggest rival and its opponent in the Tehran derby is Persepolis. The first derby match between the clubs took place on 5 April 1968, at Amjadieh Stadium. Today, all derbies and home matches are played at Azadi Stadium which is usually sold out for the derby. Esteghlal has the most wins in the Tehran derby with 26 victories.

The game between Esteghlal and Al-Hilal is called Clasico Asia

This team has competein many competitions in the past due to t he ownership of most stadiums in Iran and the most assets in the Asian continent. And the entire team from Esteghlal Khuzestan. Esteghlal Mulathani. Esteghlal Shiraz Esteghlal Tabriz, there are almost 20 teams with this name in Iran that play in different leagues. There is also the Tajik Independence Team. Esteghlal has a friendship agreement with Qatar's Al-Sad.

Supporters

Esteghlal is one of the most supported teams in Iranian and Asian football. The most popular team in Iran. The club is based in Tehran and is popular in all parts of the country. Esteghlal also has a fan base in the United States, Europe and Persian Gulf countries. According to statistics, the club has more than forty million fans.at 2010 to 2020, the team was able to achieve six times the average number of spectators in the whole of Asia.

Grounds

Azadi Stadium is Iran's national stadium and the largest in the country. Azadi Stadium officially had a capacity of 100,000 people at the beginning and was built to host the 1974 Asian Games. The stadium is part of the much larger Azadi Sports Complex and is surrounded by a rowing river, football training pitches, a weightlifting complex, swimming facilities and indoor volleyball and futsal courts, among many other amenities. Today, Azadi Stadium has a capacity of 78,116 after renovations in 2016.

Esteghlal's home stadium is Azadi, a football stadium in Tehran, Iran. The stadium's former name was Aryamehr Stadium which was changed after the Iranian Revolution. The stadium has been filled over capacity on numerous occasions; for example, when it has faced rivals Persepolis in the Tehran derby or in several AFC Champions League matches. Prior to the construction of Azadi, Esteghlal used to play their games at Amjadieh Stadium.

Players

Current squad
See also: 2022–23 Esteghlal F.C. season

 U21 = Under 21 year player. U23 = Under 23 year player. U25 = Under 25 year player. INJ = Out of main squad due to injury.

Out on loan

Reserve squad
Note: These players are on the team list. They also participate in team training and are under the contracts. Mostly they are not on the list of 18 players.

Club captains

Esteghlal captains since 1990.

Personnel

Club managers

Current technical staff

Notable managers

Only managers who have won official trophies are listed.

Key

Chairmen

Current management board

Chairmen

Honours

Esteghlal is the most proud team of Iran with 38 official championship titles in provincial, national and continental cups.

Domestic
It has 38 official cups, 

27 runners-up in official cups and 16 friendly cups at the international and domestic levels.

League

Iran League
 Winners (9): 1970–71, 1974–75, 1989–90, 1997–98, 2000–01, 2005–06, 2008–09, 2012–13, 2021–22
 Runners-up (10): 1973–74, 1991–92, 1994–95, 1998–99, 1999–2000, 2001–02, 2003–04, 2010–11, 2016–17, 2019–20
Iran Championship
 Winners (1): 1957

Cups
Hazfi Cup (record)
 Winners (7): 1976–77, 1995–96, 1999–2000, 2001–02, 2007–08, 2011–12, 2017–18
 Runners-up (6): 1989–90, 1998–99, 2003–04, 2015–16, 2019–20, 2020–21

Super Cup
 Winners (1): 2022
 Runners-up (1): 2018

Provincial (High Level)
Tehran League (record)
 Winners (13): 1949–50, 1952–53, 1956–57, 1957–58, 1959–60, 1960–61, 1962–63, 1968–69, 1970–1971, 1972–73, 1983–84, 1985–86, 1991–92
 Runners-up (7): 1946–47, 1951–52, 1958–59, 1969–70, 1982–83, 1989–90, 1990–91
Tehran Hazfi Cup
 Winners (4): 1946–47, 1950–51, 1958–59, 1960–61
 Runners-up (3): 1945–46, 1957–58, 1969–70
Tehran Super Cup (shared record)
 Winners (1): 1994

Continental
AFC Champions League (Iran record)
 Winners (2): 1970, 1990–91
 Runners-up (2): 1991, 1998–99
 Third place (3): 1971, 2001–02, 2013

Doubles and Treble
Esteghlal has achieved the Double on 5 occasions in its history:

 Iran League and Tehran League
 1957–58 Season
 1970–71 Season

 Tehran League and Tehran Hazfi Cup
 1958–59 Season
 1960–61 Season

 AFC Champions League and Tehran League
 1990–91 Season

Esteghlal has achieved the Treble on 1 occasions in its history:

 AFC Champions League and Iran League and Tehran League
 1970–71 Season

Minor Tournaments

International
 DCM Trophy
Winners (4): 1969, 1970, 1971, 1989
 Bordoloi Trophy
Winners (1): 1989
 Qatar Independence Cup
Winners (1): 1991
 Turkmenistan President's Cup
Winners (1): 1998
 Caspian International Cup
Winners (1): 1998

Statistics and records

Statistics in IPL
 Seasons in IPL: 21 (all)
 Best position in IPL: First (2005–06, 2008–2009, 2012–13, 2021–22)
 Worst position in IPL: 13 (2007–08)
 Most goals scored in a season: 70 (2008–09)
 Most goals scored in a match: 6 – 0 (1 time)
 Most goals conceded in a match: 4 – 1(4 times)
 Player with a most goal in a single match: Reza Enayati with 5 goals

Statistics in ACC/ACL
 Most goals scored in a match: 8 – 0 (1 time)
 Most goals conceded in a match: 6 – 1 (1 time)
 Player with the most goals in a single match: Ali Jabari with 3 goals

Statistics in Hazfi Cup
 Most goals scored in a match: 13 – 0 (1 time)
 Most goals conceded in a match: 0 – 3 (1 time)
 Player with the most goals in a single match: Arash Borhani with 5 goals

Season-by-season

Esteghlal Women's Football Club 

Esteghlal was the first club in Iran that established a team for women's football. To reach this goal the club has made some Camps for training players.

The first attempts to launch women's soccer in Iran began in the late 1960s. In 1969, with the increase in the number of women interested in football in Iran, the Football Federation sent several talented women to FIFA training courses. During the trip, Iranian coaches were able to watch matches of Asian women's soccer teams such as South Korea, India and Singapore, held at the venue. Iranian football authorities then decided to form women's soccer teams at the club level. Esteghlal F.C. (TAJ) was the first Iranian club to establish a women's soccer training class and set up its own women's team.

The women's team which competed in the Kowsar Women Football League was dissolved in 2016 due to financial issues.

References

External links

 
 
 

 
Association football clubs established in 1945
Football clubs in Iran
1945 establishments in Iran
AFC Champions League winning clubs